Tantallon may be:

Tantallon Castle, Scotland
Tantallon, Nova Scotia
Upper Tantallon, Nova Scotia (immediately to the north of Tantallon, Nova Scotia)
Tantallon, Saskatchewan
Tantallon, Maryland